Boris Yurevich, in russian Борис Юрьевич, dead in Suzdal May 2 1159, was son of Yuri Dolgorukiy and his first wife. He was kniaz of Belgorod Kievsky, Prince of Turov and Kideksha. He was buried in the Kideksha Church.

Princes_of_Turov
Princes_of_Belgrod